7 Eccles Street was a row house in Dublin, Ireland. 
It was the home of Leopold Bloom, protagonist of the novel Ulysses (1922) by James Joyce.
The house was demolished in 1967, and the site is now occupied by the Mater Private Hospital.

History

In 1769 Isaac Ambrose Eccles leased a parcel of land on the north side of Eccles Street to Daniel Goodwin, carpenter.
This became the site of numbers 6–8 Eccles Street. 
John Darley, stone-cutter, leased the adjoining land, the site of numbers 1–5.
Margaret Reed acquired the property at 7 Eccles Street from Goodwin on 29 April 1771, along with Numbers 6 and 8 (the entire premises measuring 60 feet fronting Eccles Street with 200 feet to the rear).

From the mid 19th century the wealthier residents of Dublin began to move further from the city center, and the houses in the area often had multiple occupancy.
Before World War I (1914–18) the street was still part of a quiet, respectable middle-class neighborhood.
In 1904 the house was not occupied, so Joyce was able to make it Bloom's home.
7 Eccles Street was designated "Tenements" in Thom's Directory in 1937, indicating a very poor condition.
In 1958 the building was occupied by seven very poor families.
Flora H. Mitchell painted 7 Eccles Street in the 1960s.
Anthony Burgess spent three days in February 1965 with a film crew to make part of a BBC television program on Joyce.
The building was abandoned, with holes in the roof and windows at the rear gutted.

The house at 7 Eccles Street, now owned by the Dominican College, was demolished in April 1967.
In July 1975 the property and others beside it were sold to the Mater Hospital Pools Society.

Visit by Joyce

Joyce first saw the row of three-story brick houses when he visited his friend John Francis Byrne at 7 Eccles Street in 1909.
Byrne was a friend of Joyce from their college days, a journalist and amateur  numerologist.
Joyce visited him one day in 1909 in a very emotional state over a rumor about Nora Barnacle's infidelities.
Byrne was able to calm him down and he stayed for dinner and then for the night.
Byrne lived at 7 Eccles Street for two years, then emigrated to the United States.

Novel

The novel describes one day in the life of Leopold Bloom, 16 June 1904.
Bloom is an advertising salesman.
He makes tea and toast for his wife, Molly, then leaves the house to get a kidney for his own breakfast.
He leaves the door ajar, because he had left his latch key in his trousers in the "creaky wardrobe" and does not want to disturb his wife.
The novel continues, describing a day in the life of a modern Ulysses, a family man whose wife is being unfaithful.
When he retires to bed in 7 Eccles Street that evening he has to remove crumbs of potted meat from the bedclothes, presumably left there by Molly and her lover.

Relics

Before the house was completely demolished John Ryan, a Dublin artist and writer who had organized the first Bloomsday in 1954, managed to rescue the front door and the surrounding brickwork.
He installed it in his pub, the Bailey, a rendezvous for Dublin writers.
In 1995 the door was moved to the James Joyce Centre on North Great George's Street.
The door knocker had been removed by a visitor from New York just before the house was demolished.
In June 2013 he returned to Dublin at the James Joyce Centre's expense and restored the knocker to the door.

Notes

Citations

Sources

Buildings and structures in Dublin (city)
Ulysses (novel)
Fictional houses
Buildings and structures demolished in 1967